The 4th Ward was one of the 22 wards of New York City with representation in the Board of Aldermen. It was made up of seven election districts and was bounded by Spruce, Ferry, Peck Slip, South, Catherine streets and Park Row.

List of Aldermen

1797 - Anthony Post (builder)
1798-1802 - John Bogert (merchant)
1810-1813 - Richard Cunningham (tanner)
1813-1816 - Peter McCartie
1818 - William F. Van Ambridge 
1819-1827 - John P. Anthony (tanner)
1824 - Samuel Cowdrey (lawyer)
1825 - John Agnew (tobacconist)
1831 - Hubert Van Wagenen (hardware store owner)
1833 - Charles G. Ferris (lawyer)

1834 - Hubert Van Wagenen (hardware store owner)
1840 - Daniel C. Pentz (cooper)
1842-1843 - Robert Martin (cordial distiller) 
1846-1847 - George H. Purser
1848 - Edmund Fitzgerald
1850-1854 - Jacob F. Oakley (liquors)
1854-1855 - William Baird
1856-1858 - Bartholomew Healy (shoe store owner)

List of Assistant Aldermen

1792-1796 - Anthony Post (builder)
1797 - John Bogert (merchant)
1798 - George Lindsey (stonecutter)
1802 - Leroy Jacob
1802-1803 - Robert Bogardus (lawyer)
1804 - Ab. Bloodgood (currier)
1805 - Adrian Hegeman (lawyer)
1806 - Robert Bogardus (lawyer)
1807 - Ab. Bloodgood (currier)
1808 - Adrian Hegeman (lawyer)

1809 - Robert Bogardus (lawyer)
1810 - Peter H. Wendover (sailmaker)
1810-1815 - Elisha W. King (lawyer)
1817 - William F. Van Ambridge 
1818 - John P. Anthony (tanner)
1819-1822 - Benjamin Crane (stationer)
1822 - Samuel Cowdrey (lawyer)
1824 - John Agnew (tobacconist)
1825 - John Hitchcock
1832 - Charles G. Ferris (lawyer)

1835 - Benjamin Townsend (grocer)
1839 - Jesse West (merchant)
1840 - Benton W. Halsey (physician)
1841 - Alfred Ashfield (coal dealer)
1845 - George H. Purser 
1848 - Nathan A. Sutton (merchant)
1849 - Jacob F. Oakley (liquors)
1850-1851 - Florence McCarthy (lawyer)
1852-1853 - Timothy O'Brien (builder)

References

Other sources
Willis, Samuel J. and Valentine, David Thomas. 1869. Manual of the Corporation of the City of New York, New York, N.Y.: E. Jones & Co.

New York City Council